Brighton Ski Resort is a ski area in the western United States, located in Big Cottonwood Canyon in Brighton, Utah. About  from downtown Salt Lake City, it is owned and operated by Boyne Resorts.

Description
Brighton Ski Resort was the first ski resort in Utah, and one of the first in the United States.  Brighton was started  in 1936 when members of the Alpine Ski Club built a rope tow from wire and an old elevator motor. The resort was named for Thomas W. Brighton, who is credited with constructing the first buildings in the area. In 1943, Zane Doyle and Willard Jensen purchased the T-bar from K Smith. In 1954 when there was talk of expansion, Willard insisted that going out on a limb to build a double chair lift instead of another T-bar was worth the risk. Those important changes were able to come about when in 1955 Zane's brother-in-law, Dean L Jensen sold his Idaho business and joined Willard and Zane to build the first double chair lift, Mt Majestic, which was constructed parallel to the old T-bar.

Mary Lift was installed in 1959 and in 1963 the trio bought out Brighton Recreation Company, which owned Millicent Lift, and Brighton Ski Bowl was off and running. The Doyle and Jensen ski operation became successful and was owned and operated by Willard, his son Dean and grandson, Gilbert Jensen; Zane and his sons Michael and Randy Doyle.  Boyne Resorts purchased the resort in 1986, sold Brighton to CNL Lifestyle in 2007, but continued to operate the property under a lease. CNL sold the property to Och-Ziff Capital Management in 2016, and Boyne repurchased it in May 2018.

Brighton claims to be a "no-frills" resort whose sole business is to provide skiers and snowboarders with top-notch trails. While it does provide lodging, dining, and shopping, the extent of the facilities does not make Brighton what is typically seen as a destination ski resort. Most Brighton skiers and riders are Utah locals. Most visitors do not stay at Brighton-run lodging; many visitors stay in the greater Salt Lake area, many of whom also plan trips to other area ski resorts.

Brighton is also known for its extensive backcountry access, visitors can purchase single ride lift tickets to reach the backcountry access gates at the top of the resort. Although the terrain inbounds at Brighton can rival that of the backcountry, Brighton is known for its cliffs, chutes, bowls and natural features. Brighton was voted to have the 2nd best snow in North America, losing the top spot to its neighbor Snowbird Ski & Summer Resort.

Brighton is on public lands; all of the resort's land is part of the Wasatch-Cache National Forest, meaning the whole resort is open to the public year-round, though tickets must be purchased to use the lifts.

Brighton is a local favorite. The resort offers a variety of special deals throughout the year that allow locals to ski cheaply. 
Generally, during the first Wednesdays in December, the resort offers a promotion called "Quad Wednesdays" where, if one brings an item to contribute to a local charity, one gets his or her lift ticket for one fourth the cost of a regular-priced ticket. Brighton is adjacent to Solitude Mountain Resort, and the two ski areas offer a common "Solbright Pass" which provides access to both resorts for a nominal surcharge. Transit between the two mountains is provided from Solitude to Brighton via the Solbright run off the Summit Express on Solitude, or via the Evergreen trail off the Milly Express on Brighton. 

Night-skiing occurs from 4:00 to 9:00 p.m. on Monday through Saturday, from early December through early April. Brighton is closed for night skiing on Christmas Eve, Christmas Day, and New Year's Eve.

Snowboarding Legacy 
From the early 1990s through the 2000s, many top professional and amateur snowboarders called Brighton their home.

Trivia
The Disney Channel Original Movies, Johnny Tsunami and Cloud 9, were filmed at Brighton Ski Resort.

References

External links

 Brighton Resort Official Site
 Brighton Ski Area info on SnowGuide.org
 3dSkiMap of Brighton Ski Resort
 Brighton's Snow Report

Ski areas and resorts in Utah
Sports venues in Salt Lake County, Utah
Event venues established in 1936